Sunny is a 2022 Marathi-language drama film directed by Hemant Dhome and produced by Akshay Bardapurkar, Kshitee Jog, Viraj Gawas and Urfi Kazmi. Screenplay and dialogue writer is Irawati Karnik. Film stars Lalit Prabhakar, Kshitee Jog, Chinmay Mandlekar, Abhishek Deshmukh in lead roles.

Cast 

 Lalit Prabhakar as Sunny
 Kshitee Jog 
 Chinmay Mandlekar as Vishwajeet
 Abhishek Deshmukh
 Amey Barve
 Parth Ketkar
 Nandini Joag 
 Ameeta Kulkarni 
 Paulo Andre Argao as Dikembe 
 Megan Liberty Edmunds 
 Michelle Callcut as Lydia
 Andrew Forbs 
 Jack McGinn as Roy
 Pedro Bosnich as Oliver

Release 
Sunny was scheduled to be theatrically released on 18 November 2022 all over Maharashtra.

Reception

Critical reception 
Mihir Bhanage of The Times of India gave 3.5 out of 5 and wrote "The film makes us realize how we take for granted the things we have in abundance, including love and care. It is a film about a hero who finds himself in the stories of the people around him. You will leave the theater with a sweet aftertaste."

References

External links 
 

2022 films
2020s Marathi-language films